Izagre is a village and municipality located in the province of León, Castile and León, Spain.

Population 
According to the 2010 census (INE), the municipality has a population of 214 inhabitants.

Villages 
Izagre's municipality has three villages:
 Albires
 Izagre
 Valdemorilla

References

Municipalities in the Province of León